die horen is a quarterly journal on literature, art and criticism published in Hanover and founded by Kurt Morawietz in 1955.

References

1955 establishments in West Germany
Literary magazines published in Germany
Magazines established in 1955
Mass media in Hanover
Quarterly magazines published in Germany